Rodolfo "Rudy" Agapay Salalima is a Filipino lawyer who was the first secretary of the Philippine Department of Information and Communications Technology (DICT) under the Duterte administration. Salalima is the former chief legal counsel and senior advisor of Globe Telecom, one of the leading telecommunications firms in the country and has also served as Senior Vice President for Corporate and Regulatory Affairs and Managing Director of Ayala Corporation. He is also the former president of the Philippine Chamber of Telecommunications Operators (PCTO) and International Telecommunication Union Council working group for the amendment of ITU constitution and convention vice chairman for Asia Pacific Region.

In 2015, Salalima authored the book entitled "Telecommunications in the Information Revolution", a law book on telecommunication policies in the country.

Background
Salalima is a Bicolano from Polangui, Albay. He was Duterte's former classmate in San Beda College of Law Class of 1971, together with former Justice secretary Vitaliano Aguirre II, and Transportation secretary Arthur Tugade. He passed the Philippine Bar Examination in 1974.

Department of Information and Communications Technology
Salalima was appointed by President Rodrigo Duterte, became the first secretary of the Department of Information and Communications Technology.

He resigned from the post on September 22, 2017. He cited corruption and interference as his reasons for resigning. Salalima was succeeded by DICT Undersecretary Eliseo Rio Jr. as an Officer-in-charge (OIC) of DICT.

External links
Salalima's profile at Bloomberg

References

20th-century Filipino lawyers
Filipino business executives
Living people
Secretaries of Information and Communications Technology of the Philippines
San Beda University alumni
Ayala Corporation people
Duterte administration cabinet members
People from Albay
Year of birth missing (living people)